Sigoulès-et-Flaugeac is a commune in the Dordogne department in Nouvelle-Aquitaine in southwestern France. It was established on 1 January 2019 by merger of the former communes of Sigoulès (the seat) and Flaugeac.

See also
Communes of the Dordogne department

References

Communes of Dordogne